David Lloyd McLain is an Oklahoma pastor and businessman who served as chairman of the Oklahoma Republican Party from 2019 to 2021. He previously served as chairman of the Tulsa County Republican Party, and was a 2016 special election candidate for District 34 of the Oklahoma Senate, where he received 43.7% of the vote against Democrat J.J. Dossett.

Career 
David is a resident of Skiatook, Oklahoma and a veteran of the United States Navy. He operates a small construction business and has volunteered for several Republican campaigns across Oklahoma. David is also a pastor who attends Immanuel Baptist Church in Skiatook, Oklahoma.

Personal life 
David and his wife Alee have been married for more than 26 years and have 3 children.

References 

1970 births
Living people
People from Skiatook, Oklahoma
Military personnel from Oklahoma
Oklahoma Republican Party chairs